Lates is a genus of freshwater and euryhaline lates perches belonging to the family Latidae. The generic name is also used as a common name, lates, for many of the species.

All species are predatory, and the Nile perch (L. niloticus), in particular, has become infamous as an invasive species introduced into the East African Lake Victoria, where many native Haplochromines were driven extinct. In contrast to the widespread Barramundi and Nile perch (though the fish does face threats from human activity), several members of the genus Lates with relatively restricted African or Asian distributions are themselves considered threatened.

Etymology
The generic name Lates derives from the Latin latēre (to be hidden).

Description
They all have the characteristic centropomid shape, with the two-part dorsal fin and general percoid form.

All species are carnivorous, preying on aquatic invertebrates and other fish in a wide variety of habitats.

Distribution and habitat

These fishes are native to freshwater and marine waters of Africa, Asia, the Indian Ocean, and the western Pacific Ocean. Several species are endemic to the Rift Valley lakes in Africa.

Species
Currently, 11 recognized species are placed in this genus:
 Lates angustifrons Boulenger, 1906 (Tanganyika lates)
 Lates calcarifer (Bloch, 1790) (barramundi)
 Lates japonicus Katayama & Y. Taki, 1984 (Japanese lates) (Japanese barramundi)
 Lates lakdiva Pethiyagoda & A. C. Gill, 2012
 Lates longispinis Worthington, 1932 (Rudolf lates)
 Lates macrophthalmus Worthington, 1929 (Albert lates)
 Lates mariae Steindachner, 1909 (bigeye lates)
 Lates microlepis Boulenger, 1898 (forktail lates)
 Lates niloticus (Linnaeus, 1758) (Nile perch)
 Lates stappersii (Boulenger, 1914) (sleek lates)
 Lates uwisara Pethiyagoda & A. C. Gill, 2012

Extinct species
Extinct species within this genus include:

 Lates gibbus  Agassiz 1833
 Lates gracilis  Agassiz 1833
 Lates macrurus  Agassiz 1833
 Lates noteus  Agassiz 1833
 Lates qatraniensis  Murray and Attia 2004
Extinct species within this genus lived from the Eocene epoch to recent, beginning around 37.2 million years ago. Fossils have been found in Africa (Libya, Egypt, Kenya, Tunisia, Chad, Uganda, the Democratic Republic of the Congo, Niger, and Sudan),  Saudi Arabia, and Slovakia.

References

 
Latidae
Taxa named by Georges Cuvier
Eocene fish
Extant Eocene first appearances